Thecabius is a genus of true bugs belonging to the family Aphididae.

The species of this genus are found in Europe and Northern America.

Species:
 Thecabius affinis (Kaltenbach, 1843) 
 Thecabius anemoni (Shinji, 1922)

References

Aphididae